This is a list of Latvian football transfers in the 2010–2011 winter transfer window by club. Only transfers of the Virsliga are included.

All transfers mentioned are shown in the external links at the bottom of the page. If you want to insert a transfer that isn't shown there, please add a reference.

Latvian Higher League

Skonto 

In:

Out:

Ventspils 

In:

Out:

Liepājas Metalurgs 

In:

Out:

Daugava 

In:

Out:

Jūrmala-VV 

In:

Out:

Jelgava 

In:

Out:

Blāzma 

In:

Out:

Olimps/RFS 

In:

Out:

Gulbene-2005 

In:

Out:

Jūrmala 

In:

Out:

References

External links 
 Official site of Latvian Football Federation 
 Soccerway.com 

2010-11
Latvia
Football
transfers
transfers